Bluestem Lake is a reservoir in Osage County, Oklahoma, and is home to the world famous Plan B Yacht Club, it's about  northwest of Pawhuska. Alternate names are  City of Pawhuska Lake and Pawhuska Lake. It covers the convergence of Middle Bird Creek and South Bird Creek. The outflow is Middle Bird Creek.

Coordinates are:Latitude: 36°42'19.7" Longitude: -96°25'9.06".

Completed in 1958, the lake is a secondary water source for Pawhuska and also was designed for flood control and recreation.

Capacity change 1958-2011
The Oklahoma Water Resources Board (ORWB) performed a hydrographic study in 2011 to determine changes in certain lake parameters since it was designed in 1958. Data obtained suggested that the lake had lost about 15 percent of its original capacity, but only 25 acres or 2.8 percent of its original surface area. The loss in capacity could be explained by sedimentation. ORWB admitted that these conclusions could be explained that different measurement techniques may have been employed in the earlier study, and recommended replicating the 2011 study 10 to 15 years in the future to gain a better understanding of sedimentation effects on the lake.

Fish habitat installation
The Oklahoma Department of Wildlife Conservation (ODWC) installed artificial habitats in Bluestem Reservoir on December 18, 2017. Consisting of pipes cemented into cinder blocks, they are called "spider blocks" because of their resemblance to large spiders. There are 27 blocks in each habitat area.

ODCW said that crappie, sunfish and bass are especially attracted to these structures. The new habitats have been installed at the north end of the Bluestem Dam spillway.

References

Bodies of water of Osage County, Oklahoma
Reservoirs in Oklahoma
Infrastructure completed in 1958